The 2015 season was IFK Göteborg's 110th in existence, their 83rd season in Allsvenskan and their 39th consecutive season in the league. They competed in Allsvenskan where they finished second for the second season in a row, Svenska Cupen where they won the competition, Svenska Supercupen where they finished as runners-up and in qualification for the UEFA Europa League where they were knocked out in the third qualifying round. IFK Göteborg also participated in one competition in which the club continued playing in for the 2016 season, 2015–16 Svenska Cupen. The season began with the group stage of Svenska Cupen on 21 February, league play started on 5 April and will last until 31 October. The season will conclude on 8 November with Svenska Supercupen against IFK Norrköping.

Jörgen Lennartsson was appointed new head coach, this after the former head coach Mikael Stahre was sacked.

The club won their 7th Svenska Cupen title on 17 May 2015 when they defeated Örebro SK with 2–1 in the final at Gamla Ullevi.

Key events
 6 June 2014: Defender Ludwig Augustinsson leaves the club, transferring to Copenhagen.
 18 August 2014: Defender Haitam Aleesami joins the club on a four-year contract, transferring from Fredrikstad FK.
 19 September 2014: Defender Kjetil Wæhler leaves the club. On 21 November he joined Tippeligaen club Vålerenga.
 21 October 2014: Midfielder Hampus Zackrisson leaves the club. On 8 December he joined Superettan club Degerfors IF.
 23 October 2014: Defender Tom Pettersson joins the club on a four-year contract, transferring from Åtvidabergs FF. 
 23 October 2014: Forward Mikael Boman joins the club on a three-year contract, transferring from Halmstads BK.
 1 November 2014: Goalkeeper Mattias Hugosson leaves the club and retires. 
 3 November 2014: Head coach Mikael Stahre is being sacked.
 4 November 2014: Midfielders Jakob Johansson and May Mahlangu both leave the club. On 28 December Johansson joined Greek club AEK Athens and on 2 February 2015 Mahlangu joined Turkish club Konyaspor.
 7 November 2014: Forward Kenneth Zohore leaves the club and returns to Fiorentina after his loan deal wasn't extended. 
 12 November 2014: Midfielder Diego Calvo leaves the club and returns to Vålerenga after his loan deal wasn't extended. 
 25 November 2014: The club announces the appointment of Jörgen Lennartsson as the new head coach.
 26 November 2014: Defender Jonathan Azulay leaves the club, transferring to Östersunds FK.
 3 December 2014: Midfielder Joel Allansson leaves the club, transferring to Randers FC. 
 3 December 2014: Midfielder Philip Haglund leaves the club. On 4 December he joined Allsvenskan rival Hammarby IF.
 8 December 2014: Defender Billy Nordström and midfielder Karl Bohm are both promoted to the first-team squad, both signing a one-year contract to keep them at the club until the end of the season.
 11 December 2014: Goalkeeper Marcus Sandberg signs a new one-year contract, keeping him at the club until the end of the season.
 17 December 2014: Defender Hjálmar Jónsson signs a new one-year contract, keeping him at the club until the end of the season.
 22 December 2014: Midfielder Sebastian Eriksson joins the club on a six months loan contract, transferring from Cagliari.
 22 December 2014: Forward Malick Mané leaves the club on loan to Hønefoss BK for the duration of the season.
 28 December 2014: Midfielders Prosper Kasim and Lawson Sabah both join the club on five-year contracts, transferring from International Allies.
 5 January 2015: Midfielder Nordin Gerzić leaves the club. On 21 January he joined his old club Örebro SK.
 29 January 2015: Defender Heath Pearce joins the club on a five-month contract, transferring from Montreal Impact.
 30 January 2015: Midfielder Daniel Sobralense leaves the club. On 3 February he joined his old club Fortaleza.
 2 February 2015: Midfielder Jakob Ankersen joins the club on a three-year contract, transferring from Esbjerg fB.
 7 February 2015: Defender Emil Salomonsson is selected as 2014 Archangel of the Year, an annual price given by the Supporterklubben Änglarna to a player who has shown a great loyalty to IFK Göteborg.
 14 March 2015: Defender Thomas Rogne joins the club on a three-year contract, transferring from Wigan Athletic.
 15 March 2015: Forward Thomas Mikkelsen joins the club on a loan deal until 1 July 2015, transferring from OB.
 8 April 2015: Goalkeeper Johan Hagman joins the club on a one-year contract, transferring from Örgryte IS.
 17 May 2015: IFK Göteborg wins their 7th Svenska Cupen title after defeating Örebro SK in the final.
 25 May 2015: Midfielder Sebastian Eriksson joins the club on a three-year contract, transferring on a permanent basis from Cagliari.
 5 June 2015: Defender Heath Pearce leaves the club.
 18 June 2015: Forward Thomas Mikkelsen leaves the club and returns to OB after his loan deal wasn't extended.
 14 July 2015: Forward Victor Sköld joins the club on a two and a half-year contract, transferring from Åtvidabergs FF.
 23 July 2015: Forward Lasse Vibe leaves the club, transferring to Brentford.
 24 July 2015: Midfielder Karl Bohm leaves the club on loan to Utsiktens BK for the duration of the season.
 28 July 2015: Defender Patrick Dyrestam leaves the club on loan to Utsiktens BK for the duration of the season.
 5 August 2015: Forward Riku Riski joins the club on a loan contract for the rest of the season, transferring from Rosenborg BK.
 11 August 2015: Midfielder Mads Albæk joins the club on a two and a half-year contract, transferring from Reims.
 16 September 2015: Forward Malick Mané leaves the club on loan to Najran until 15 July 2016.
 5 November 2015: Goalkeeper John Alvbåge is selected as Allsvenskan goalkeeper of the year.

Players

Squad

Youth players with first-team appearances
Youth players who played a competitive match for the club in 2015.

Transfers

In

Out

Squad statistics

Appearances and goals

Disciplinary record

Club

Coaching staff

Other information

Competitions

Overall

Allsvenskan

League table

Results summary

Results by round

Matches
Kickoff times are in UTC+2 unless stated otherwise.

Svenska Cupen

2014–15
The tournament continued from the 2014 season.

Kickoff times are in UTC+1 unless stated otherwise.

Group stage

Knockout stage

2015–16
The tournament continued into the 2016 season.

Qualification stage

Svenska Supercupen

UEFA Europa League

Kickoff times are in UTC+2 unless stated otherwise.

Qualifying phase and play-off round

Second qualifying round

Third qualifying round

Non competitive

Pre-season
Kickoff times are in UTC+1 unless stated otherwise.

Mid-season
Kickoff times are in UTC+2.

References

IFK Göteborg seasons
IFK Goteborg